Pultenaea ferruginea, commonly known as large bronze bush-pea, is a species of flowering plant in the family Fabaceae and is endemic to eastern Australia. It is an erect shrub with hairy stems, narrow egg-shaped leaves with the narrower end towards the base, and yellow to reddish-orange flowers with reddish-brown markings.

Description

Taxonomy and naming
Pultenaea ferruginea was first formally described in 1816 by Edward Rudge in Transactions of the Linnean Society of London. The specific epithet (ferruginea) means "rust-coloured".

Distribution and habitat
Large bronze bush-pea grows in forest, wooldland and heath on the coast and ranges of New South Wales from the Central Coast to Tathra.

References

ferruginea
Flora of New South Wales
Plants described in 1816
Taxa named by Edward Rudge